William Lobkowicz (born 7 September 1961) is a nobleman from the House of Lobkowicz of American origin with Bohemian (Czech) roots. He grew up in Boston, Massachusetts, but moved to then Czechoslovakia in 1990 to claim his family's vast ancestral belongings, the restoration, preservation and display of which have become his profession and passion.

Family and youth
William is the fourth child and third son of Martin Lobkowicz by his Kentucky-born wife, Margaret Juett. Although junior members of the House of Lobkowicz were also once entitled to the prefix of "Prince" and the style of Serene Highness, William prefers to use the title only where professionally useful.
  
William Lobkowicz first visited Czechoslovakia in 1976 when he was 14. He attended Milton Academy for high school and then went to Harvard University as an undergraduate where he majored in European history. After his studies, Lobkowicz became a successful businessman in Massachusetts.

Personal life
He married Alexandra Florescu (b. 1963), daughter of historian Radu Florescu who belongs to one of Romania's oldest noble families, Florescu family. They have 3 children together: 
 Prince William Rudolf (b.1994)
 Princess Ileana (b. 1997)
 Princess Sophia (b. 2001)

Restoration of property

Shortly after the fall of the Communist government in Czechoslovakia at the end of 1989, William Lobkowicz moved to the country of his ancestors to claim the family's former lands and castles. Lobkowicz's initial work focused on having the property legally restored to the family, a project which took much money and time.

Lobkowicz has since focused on the restoration, maintenance, and upkeep of the castles now under his ownership. Of the more than ten castles and palaces once possessed by the House of Lobkowicz, William Lobkowicz now oversees four of them, including the ancestral Lobkowicz Palace (formerly Pernštejn Palace) at Prague Castle Complex, with some of the remainder having been sold off to finance the restoration as well as long-term maintenance of the other four. Additional financing has been obtained by converting some of the family properties to hotels and restaurants. The Lobkowicz Palace includes a restaurant, and guided English-speaking tours are offered.

Lobkowicz Palace at Prague Castle 
One of two existing Lobkowicz palaces in Prague (the other Lobkovický palác being the seat of the German Embassy), the building restored to William Lobkowicz is situated at the utmost wing of the vast area of Prague Castle on the Hradčany Hill.

The Lobkowicz Palace exhibition includes original manuscripts of Wolfgang Amadeus Mozart and Ludwig van Beethoven compositions. The most valuable manuscript in the collection is the original score of Beethoven´s Opus 55, Symphony No. 3 in E-flat major (Eroica), composed in 1803/04. Beethoven had originally conceived of dedicating the symphony to Napoleon Bonaparte, but this would have deprived him of a fee that he would receive if he instead dedicated the symphony to Prince Joseph Franz Maximilian Lobkowicz. This Lobkowicz ancestor was also the dedicatee of some other great works, including Joseph Haydn's "Lobkowitz" quartets (Opus 77), and Beethoven's 5th and 6th symphonies, as well as his Opus 18 string quartets.

Further, the exhibition shows, i.a., The Hay Harvest painting by Pieter Bruegel the Elder (also known as Haymaking), one of five remaining landscape paintings belonging to The Months cycle. This work depicts the period of June–July and was created by the artist in 1565. In a frescoed hall of the palace, concerts of classical music are frequently given.

References

External links 
 Lobkowicz family website

Living people
Bohemian nobility
William
Harvard University alumni
1961 births